John Prabhudoss is the Chairman of the Federation of Indian American Christian Organizations (FIACONA), a national umbrella organization of Indian American Christians and of those who are interested in issues affecting Indian Christians. He is one of the charter members of FIACONA in 2000. After serving in different capacities, he was elected as its 6th President in 2014 and became its Chairman in 2019.

Career 
In 1991 Prabhudoss joined the Apostolic Coalition, a grassroots organization focusing on national public policy. It was headed by its Executive Director Rev Jeff Snyder. The organization Christian movement represented the voice of over seven million members across the United States. After working with Rev. Jeff Snyder for over six years, Prabhudoss began to spend more time on issues affecting Christian populations in other countries where Christians are a minority.

In 2000, when Mr. Atal Bihari Vajpayee, the then Prime Minister of India from a Hindu nationalist political party visited Washington, D.C., Prabhudoss coordinated the efforts to highlight the violence against Christian communities carried out by his Hindu affiliated groups in India. That successful effort brought major Indian American Christian leaders of various denominations together to create the Federation of Indian American Christian Organizations (of North America) in 2000.

Prabhudoss has been working with successive US Administrations since then in various capacities within FIACONA to help shape US policies towards India while keeping the violence against Christian church in India in its focus.

Mr. Prabhudoss has called for the Christian community around the world to stand in solidarity with the church in India at a time when the nationalist forces in India are unleashing a campaign of violence against over a 100 million people who follow Christian faith in India.

Art of Governance Program 
After consulting many indigenous leaders of various backgrounds across Iraq in person, Mr. Prabhudoss developed the Art of Governance Program to help emerging leaders and organizations to develop a sustainable fair and equitable functioning democracy in Iraq.

Mr. Prabhudoss met several leaders in Iraq from Najaf in the south to Sulaymaniyah and Erbil in the north of Iraq and conducted on-site assessments to test and strengthen educational materials for the program.

The proposal was presented to the Coalition Provisional Authority in Bagdad, Iraq for their consent but due to lack of cooperation and theft of intellectual property during the process, further efforts had to be differed.

Kashmir 
Mr. Prabhudoss led a very successful historical peace mission to Pakistan and India over the disputed region of Kashmir in 2005 at the urging of a Gandhian leader Ms. Nirmala Deshpande. During the visit, he held extensive onsite discussions with political, civic, religious leaders, and refugees besides the separatist leaders both on Indian and Pakistani sides of Kashmir.

Other Notable Initiatives 
Between 1995 and 2005, Mr. Prabhudoss held several meetings and discussions towards finding a political solution to the ethnic conflict in Sri Lanka between the Tamil Tigers and other groups. Meanwhile, he also developed in-depth understanding of the conflict to know what kinds of solutions are practical. Met several separatist leaders and stake holders in an effort to bring them to the table short of a military solution.

Besides some of these noted efforts above, Mr. Prabhudoss was also involved in conflict resolutions efforts in places like Tibet, Myanmar, Syria, Pakistan, Bangladesh, Afghanistan, and Nepal, to name a few. He continues to publicly speak about many of the short sighted policies of the US government agencies proposed by inexperienced policy staff which seriously undermines not only American values but also adversely impact the long term national interests of the United States like it has in China, Pakistan and other regions.

References 

American activists
American people of Indian descent
Living people
Year of birth missing (living people)
Indian activists